Czerny is a surname meaning "black" in some Slavic languages. It is one of many variant forms, including Czarny, Černý, Czernik, Cherney, and Čierny, among others.

People
Notable people with this surname include:
Adalbert Czerny (1863−1941), German pediatrician, co-founder of modern pediatrics
Carl Czerny (1791−1857), Austrian pianist, composer and teacher
Joseph Czerny (1785-1842), composer, pianist
George Czerny (1766−1817), alternate name of Serbian political leader Karađorđe Petrović
Halina Czerny-Stefańska (1922-2001), Polish pianist
Henry Czerny (born 1959), Canadian actor
Leander Czerny (1859−1944), Czech entomologist
Ludwig Czerny (born 1941), German technician, film producer and film director
Marianus Czerny (1896–1985), German experimental physicist 
Michael Czerny (born 1946), Roman Catholic Cardinal
Sabine Czerny, Bavarian primary school teacher
Vincenz Czerny (1842−1916), German surgeon
Zygmunt Czerny (1888–1975), Polish romance philologist

Fictional characters
Tibor Czerny, a character in the 1939 film Midnight
Czerny, a dog owned by Kanako Sensei in the manga series Inubaka
Noah Czerny, a character in The Raven Cycle book series by Maggie Stiefvater

Other
6294 Czerny, minor planet
Hofmann & Czerny (Hofmann-Wien), piano manufacturing company from Austria

See also 
 Cerney (disambiguation)
 Churney (disambiguation)

Surnames of Slavic origin